Paul Sykes may refer to:
 Paul Sykes (boxer) (1946–2007), English heavyweight boxer
 Paul Sykes (businessman) (born 1943), English Eurosceptic businessman and political donor
 Paul Sykes (rugby league) (born 1981), English rugby league footballer
 Paul Sykes (singer) (1937–1994), American folksinger
 Paul Sykes, English non-league footballer who died while playing
 Paul Sykes, former member of The Yogscast